HMS Cupar was a  of the Royal Navy from World War I. She was originally to be named Rosslare, but was renamed before launch to avoid possible misunderstandings of having vessels named after coastal locations.

See also
Cupar, Fife, Scotland

References

 

 

Hunt-class minesweepers (1916)
Royal Navy ship names
1918 ships
Maritime incidents in 1919
Ships sunk by mines
Shipwrecks in the North Sea